Rudolf Swoboda may refer to:
 Rudolf Swoboda (1859–1914), Austrian painter
 Rudolf Swoboda the Elder (1819–1859), Austrian painter, uncle of Rudolf